Nataliya Trafimava (born 16 June 1979) is a retired Belarusian basketball player who competed in the 2008 Summer Olympics.

References

1979 births
Living people
Belarusian women's basketball players
Olympic basketball players of Belarus
Basketball players at the 2008 Summer Olympics
Basketball players at the 2016 Summer Olympics
Forwards (basketball)